Antajave or Antajawi (possibly from Quechua anta copper and Aymara jawi wool or fleece of wool, also spelled Antajave) is a  mountain in the north of the Barroso mountain range in the Andes of southern Peru. It is situated in the Tacna Region, Tarata Province, Tarata District. It lies north of Incapachata and southeast of Purupuruni.

References

Mountains of Peru
Mountains of Tacna Region